Bledlow Ridge is a village in the civil parish of Bledlow-cum-Saunderton in Buckinghamshire, England.  In 2004 the population was 940. It is situated in the Chiltern Hills, about 4 miles SSW of Princes Risborough and on the road between the High Wycombe and Chinnor.

Originally the hamlet was within the ecclesiastical parish of Bledlow. It gained separate status in 1868 when the new chapel, dedicated to St Paul, was constructed.

In common with other similar villages in the Chiltern Hills properties have become increasingly sought after due to its location and the improvement in rail and road connections to London. It has a recently refurbished village shop, The Country Store Kedai, and a local school, Bledlow Ridge School. Bledlow Ridge has a number of clubs such as 'Bridge' a youth club and a cricket club. As well as the corner shop, there is also an Equestrian Centre, park, tennis courts and a cricket pitch owned by the 'Bledlow Ridge Cricket Club'. Yoesden, south of Chinnor Road, is a nature reserve managed by the Berkshire, Buckinghamshire and Oxfordshire Wildlife Trust.

Notable residents
Sir Stuart Hampson – Former Chairman of the John Lewis Partnership.
Stewart Copeland – Founder and drummer of The Police.

References

External links

Villages in Buckinghamshire